The Spalding Women's Open Stroke Play was a national women's 72-hole stroke play golf tournament played in England from 1954 to 1959. It was sometimes referred to as the unofficial stroke play championship. The 1954 event was won by Jean Donald, who had recently become a professional. The event was preceded by the Women's National Tournament which was held from 1945 to 1951 and again in 1953.

Winners

References

Amateur golf tournaments in the United Kingdom
Women's golf in the United Kingdom
Recurring sporting events established in 1954
Recurring sporting events disestablished in 1959
1954 establishments in England
1959 disestablishments in England